Surpass was a short-lived Wrigley antacid gum. Shipments of Surpass to retail outlets were discontinued in March 2003 due to lack of popularity.

References

External links
 Wrigley's page on Surpass

Chewing gum
Wrigley Company brands